Michaël Clepkens (born 30 January 1986) is a Belgian professional football goalkeeper currently playing for Knokke.

Clepkens started his professional career with Diegem and Racing Mechelen in the Belgian Third Division, before signing with Belgian Second Division team Waasland-Beveren in 2010. After gaining promotion, he was signed by Kortrijk in the fall of 2013 as a replacement goalkeeper.

Famous moments
In Belgium, Clepkens is most known for two special feats, first he guided Racing Mechelen to the quarter finals of the 2008–09 Belgian Cup, after holding Zulte Waregem to a 0–0 draw during regular time, before making two saves during the penalty shootout and scoring the winning penalty kick himself. His second remarkable feat is scoring a last-minute header against Mons during the Belgian Second Division Final Rounds 2011–20#2011, denying the opponents their promotion to the Belgian Pro League.

References

External links
 

1986 births
Living people
Belgian footballers
Belgian expatriate footballers
Expatriate footballers in Luxembourg
Belgian Pro League players
Challenger Pro League players
K.R.C. Mechelen players
S.K. Beveren players
K.V. Kortrijk players
F91 Dudelange players
K Beerschot VA players
Lommel S.K. players
Association football goalkeepers
K. Diegem Sport players